Nemoria pistaciaria is a species of emerald moth in the family Geometridae. It is found in North America.

The MONA or Hodges number for Nemoria pistaciaria is 7027.

References

Further reading

 

Geometrinae
Articles created by Qbugbot
Moths described in 1876